Mirror is the third solo album by Emitt Rhodes with a much heavier rock approach than the debut.

Track listing
All songs composed and arranged by Emitt Rhodes
 "Birthday Lady" - 2:50
 "Better Side of Life" - 2:37
 "My Love Is Strong" - 2:39
 "Side We Seldom Show" - 2:26
 "Mirror" - 2:47
 "Really Wanted You" - 2:42
 Medley: "Bubble Gum the Blues" / "I'm a Cruiser" - 4:43
 "Love Will Stone You" - 3:23
 "Golden Child of God" - 2:43
 "Take You Far Away" - 3:00

Personnel
Emitt Rhodes: All instruments and voices.
Keith Olsen: Mixdown Engineer.

References
 Emitt Rhodes: Recorded at Home, by Kevin Ryan, Tape Op #33, Jan. 2003, pp 44–50.

Emitt Rhodes albums
1971 albums
Dunhill Records albums